Gráinne is a feminine given name in the Irish language. The name is of an uncertain origin, although it is possible that it may be connected with the word , meaning "the Sun". In Irish legend, Deorghrianne ("a Tear of the Sun") is the daughter of Fiachna, Son of Betach. The name is also borne by a famed character in Irish mythology—Gráinne, who was the daughter of Cormac mac Airt, a legendary High King of Ireland.

The name can be Latinised as Grania; and can be Anglicised as Granya. The name Gráinne can also be represented in English as Grace, Gertrude, and Gertie. These English names are etymologically unrelated to Gráinne. Gráinne is pronounced as 'Grawn-ya' in all dialects bar Ulster Irish where it is pronounced as 'Grah-nya'.

Bearers of the name

 Gráinne, daughter of Cormac mac Airt
 Gráinne Ní Mháille (c.1530–c.1603), Chieftain of the Clan Ó Máille, and pirate. Also known as 'The Pirate Queen'
 Grainne Clancy (born 1961), Irish cricketer
 Gráinne Conole (born 1964), Irish academic
 Grainne Gallanagh (born 1994), Irish model
 Grainne Godfree, American television writer
 Grainne Kierans, (born 1978), Irish international footballer
 Grainne Leahy (born 1966), Irish cricketer
 Grainne McGoldrick, Irish camogie player
 Gráinne Mulvey (born 1966), Irish composer
 Gráinne Murphy (born 1993), Irish swimmer
 Gráinne Seoige (born 1973), television presenter

See also 
 Grian

References

External links
 http://medievalscotland.org/kmo/AnnalsIndex/Feminine/Grainne.shtml

Irish-language feminine given names